The Swan 55 Frers is the second Swan 55 but this time designed by German Frers and built by Nautor's Swan and first launched in 1988. Most boats are fitted with a transom extension giving a reverse transom sheer.

External links
 Nautor Swan
 German Frers Official Website

References

Sailing yachts
Keelboats
1980s sailboat type designs
Sailboat types built by Nautor Swan
Sailboat type designs by Germán Frers